Dračevica is a village on the island of Brač.

As of December 2018, 59 people live in the village year-round. In December of 2018, an anonymous donor gifted a 500 kuna voucher to all permanent residents of the village.

References

Brač
Populated places in Split-Dalmatia County